Loose Loot is a 1953 short subject directed by Jules White starring American slapstick comedy team The Three Stooges (Moe Howard, Larry Fine and Shemp Howard). It is the 146th entry in the series released by Columbia Pictures starring the comedians, who released 190 shorts for the studio between 1934 and 1959.

Plot
The Stooges are the sole heirs to a grandiose inheritance, but the money is in the hands of an underhanded broker named Icabod Slipp (Kenneth MacDonald). One by one the Stooges confront Slipp in his office. He in turn accuses first Larry, then Moe, then Shemp, of being that crook, and successfully flees his office with the money.

The Stooges follow Slipp into a theater, where they find him and his partner Joe with the cash. Both groups go back and forth trading the bag of inheritance money and blows. Eventually, the Stooges defeat Slipp and Joe. The Stooges go to retrieve their money in a nearby closet where they stored it during the commotion. However, three showgirls that Shemp scared off earlier were also hiding in there and learned of the money. They throw the bag back and forth, attempting to keep it away from the Stooges, but then a portrait of Napoleon comes to life, catches the bag, and runs away. However, Moe throws a brick to Napoleon's head and knocks him out. The Stooges run inside the portrait, take the bag of money, and dance in celebration.

Cast

Credited
 Moe Howard as Moe
 Larry Fine as Larry
 Shemp Howard as Shemp
 Kenneth MacDonald as Icabod Slipp
 Tom Kennedy as Joe

Uncredited
 Emil Sitka as Attorney (stock footage)
 Nanette Bordeaux as French showgirl
 Suzanne Ridgeway as Suzie, showgirl
 Johnny Kascier as Napoleon
 Beverly Thomas as Showgirl

Production notes
The first half of Loose Loot consists of footage recycled from Hold That Lion!.

Johnny Kascier’s playing of Napoleon in the painting was similar to I'll Never Heil Again with Curly Howard. The Three Stooges are fighting over a turkey, they throw it and Napoleon steals the turkey and runs away.
Icabod Slipp's name appears on the door as "I. Slipp." This is a semantic parody on the Long Island town of Islip, New York.

References

External links
 
 
Loose Loot at threestooges.net

1953 films
1953 comedy films
The Three Stooges films
American black-and-white films
The Three Stooges film remakes
Films directed by Jules White
Columbia Pictures short films
American comedy films
1950s English-language films
1950s American films